The Mayotte national rugby union team represents Mayotte in the sport of rugby union. As an overseas department of France, Mayotte can participate in international competition, but not for the Rugby World Cup. Mayotte has thus far competed in the south section of the CAR Development Trophy along with African nations.



Record

Overall

See also
 French Rugby Federation
 Comité Territorial de Rugby de Mayotte
 Rugby union in Mayotte

References

External links
 Comité Territorial de Rugby de Mayotte on facebook.com

Rugby union in Mayotte
R
African national rugby union teams
1995 establishments in Mayotte